Nathan John Luscombe (born 6 November 1989) is a former English footballer who played as a winger.

Career
Born in Gateshead, Tyne and Wear, Luscombe progressed through the Sunderland youth system and signed a professional contract on 1 July 2008. He made his first team debut on 4 February 2009 in an FA Cup fourth round tie against Blackburn Rovers, aged 19. He had a trial with Conference National club York City in November 2010, playing in a reserve team game against the Middlesbrough academy. He was amongst eight players to be released by Sunderland on 7 April 2011 and on 15 April he agreed to sign for League One side Hartlepool United on 1 July.

Luscombe came under scrutiny upon joining Hartlepool in 2011 after an image taken of the winger in pre-season training of the winger appearing overweight, after this Luscombe admitted that he was "embarrassed" by the image stating "I've always said I was ashamed when I came back. I was embarrassed to see a photo in one of the papers and I could have been a sumo wrestler, I was that big. It wasn't the fact I couldn't run, but it took me longer to get in shape where I could be at my best" and vowed to continue to lose weight with doing extra work in training.

He scored his first career goal in a 2–0 home win for Hartlepool against Exeter in September 2011. He made 13 league appearances at the end of his first season with Hartlepool.

Luscombe was excluded from Hartlepool's 2012 pre-season tour of Holland due to him returning to training overweight which left boss Neale Cooper "raging" and "unable to speak to him".

He was released by Hartlepool in May 2013
 after making 26 league appearances for the club, 21 of which were substitute appearances.

He was signed by Northern League club Celtic Nation and played his first game for the side in a 1–1 draw at home to Bishop Auckland. Luscombe was released by Celtic Nation at the end of the season and ended up quitting football.

References

External links

1989 births
Living people
Footballers from Gateshead
English footballers
Association football wingers
Sunderland A.F.C. players
Hartlepool United F.C. players